The Ole Miss Rebels baseball team represents the University of Mississippi in NCAA Division I college baseball. The team participates in the West Division of the Southeastern Conference (SEC). They are currently coached by Mike Bianco and play at Swayze Field. They have competed in the College World Series six times, with their first national championship coming in 2022.

History
The University of Mississippi has games recorded as early as 1893. What is commonly referred to as the "modern era" is considered to have started in 1947.

Twenty different coaches have led the Ole Miss baseball team, but only six of those have done so during the modern era. Mike Bianco became the latest Ole Miss Rebels baseball head coach in June 2000.

They have captured four Southeastern Conference Western Division titles, the last in 2018. The Rebels club have won seven Southeastern Conference championships and have made the NCAA tournament 23 times. They have also advanced to the College World Series in Omaha, Nebraska, six times, most recently in 2022.

Early years (1893–1946)
The first Ole Miss baseball game on record is a 6–3 loss to Mississippi A&M (now known as Mississippi State University) in Starkville, Mississippi, during 1893.

On the eve of World War I the Rebel baseball team was helmed by future New York Yankee and Hall of Fame member Casey Stengel. He compiled a record of 13–9 as skipper of the Rebels and earned the nickname "The Old Perfessor."

Smith-Swayze era (1947–1971)
During the Smith-Swayze era, Ole Miss played in three College World Series. The team also won four SEC championships.

Jake Gibbs era (1972–1990)

After the conclusion of his major league baseball career, Jake Gibbs returned to Oxford to coach the Ole Miss baseball team. His first season demonstrated he was winner as a coach just as he had been as a player. But the 1972 season started slow for Gibbs and the Rebels. Going into the 10th game of the season the team was just 4-5. Ole Miss began a run once conference play began and compiled a 15–3 mark against the other teams in the SEC, including a sweep of rival Mississippi State University. This mark was good enough to secure the SEC title. In the 1972 NCAA University Division baseball tournament the team defeated Jacksonville State but suffered a loss at the hands of ACC Champion Virginia. A subsequent win over Florida State placed them in a rematch with Virginia, a game they won convincingly 9-0. The tournament ended with 2 games against South Alabama, a team that had swept Ole Miss at the beginning of the season. Once again, Ole Miss proved they were the better team when it mattered, winning both and advancing to the College World Series.

The 1977 baseball season saw the Southeastern Conference adopt a conference tournament for the first time. The winner of the conference tournament was extended an automatic invitation to the NCAA tournament. This privilege has continued unbroken to the present. The 1977 Rebel squad, coached by Jake Gibbs, captured the regular season SEC title with a 15–9 record. This gave the Rebels hosting duties for the first conference tournament. Ole Miss turned their home field advantage and #1 seed into a title, winning the inaugural tournament with a record of 4-1.

Don Kessinger era (1991–1996)

By the middle of the 1990s the Rebel baseball team was consistently winning 30 games each season but had been absent from the post season since 1977. The commitment to baseball remained strong, however. Jake Gibbs retired in 1990 and another former Rebel All-American and Major League star Don Kessinger took over the reigns. His 1995 squad won 40 games and ended the team's postseason drought. Led by All-Americans David Delucci and Jamey Price, the Rebels advanced to the championship game of the 1995 NCAA Division I baseball tournament regional but were eliminated by host Florida State.

Pat Harrison era (1997–2000)

In 1999 the NCAA adopted the current 64-team Regional and Super Regional format for playoffs. Ole Miss, a storied program that had long been slumbering, made an appearance in this inaugural tournament, just their second trip to the postseason in 22 years. They won their first regional game under the new format, a 12–3 drubbing of Monmouth before they were eliminated by host Texas A&M.

Mike Bianco era (2001–present)

The hiring of Mike Bianco, a former LSU player and coach, from McNeese State began a long period of awakening the sleeping giant of Ole Miss baseball. At the helm of the Cowboys program for 3 seasons Bianco won 100 games and appeared in the 2000 post season. He had no trouble finding immediate success in Oxford as he guided the Rebels to the 2001 post season and won the second regional game in school history.

The 2005 Ole Miss Rebels team ascended to heights unseen in Oxford for many years. The team won 48 games that season, won their first SEC Western Division crown, and earned the first national seed in school history. The Rebels went 4–0 in the Regional and Super Regional tournaments defeating Maine, Oklahoma (x2) and Texas before losing 2 straight to Texas by no more than 2 runs. The Longhorns would then continue to Omaha and win the National Title. Their loss to Ole Miss was just one of their two losses the entire post season.

The 2006 campaign was not one of rebuilding but of reloading. The Rebels won 44 games and sprinted through the postseason. During the SEC Conference Tournament in Hoover, Alabama Ole Miss went 4–0 and won their first tournament title since 1977. The next two weekends they won 4 more straight games in Regional and Super Regional competition with wins over Bethune-Cookman, South Alabama, Tulane, and Miami. As with the prior season Ole Miss ended the season in Super Regionals with 2 straight losses after gaining an initial 1–0 lead in the series. Miami would go to deal eventual National Champion Oregon State one of their two losses in Omaha.

The 2007 season cemented Mike Bianco's Rebels as a dominant force in college baseball. The team topped 40 wins for the third consecutive season as well as reached the Super Regional portion of the NCAA tournament for the third consecutive time. Their season ended at the hands of #5 National Seed Arizona State in Tempe.

For the first time since 1977, the Rebels won a share of the Southeastern Conference regular season title in 2009. The team won 20 conference games and 48 total on the season. The Rebels were selected to host a regional in Oxford where they defeated Missouri and Western Kentucky. The regional championship came courtesy of a brilliant pitching performance by Drew Pomeranz in a Monday elimination game. Pomeranz pitched a complete game and struck out 16 Western Kentucky Hilltoppers in the 4–1 win. In super regional play against Virginia, Ole Miss won the first game but were unable to complete the series and fell 1–2 to the Cavaliers.

The Rebels surprised critics in 2014 by capturing the SEC West title (their 3rd under Mike Bianco) and topping 40 wins for the 5th time.  Nine players from the 2014 roster were drafted by Major League teams, the most of any team in the nation. Ole Miss went 3–0 in regional play with a win over Jacksonville St. and two over Washington (including an extra-inning second win) to advance to their 5th Super Regional.

The team traveled to Lafayette, Louisiana to face the #1 ranked Ragin' Cajuns in Super Regional action. Despite losing the first game, the Rebels rallied to win games 2 and 3 and advance to the College World Series.

After opening the CWS with a loss to the Virginia Cavaliers, the Rebels reeled off 2 straight wins against Texas Tech and TCU in the losers bracket, advancing to the Semi-Finals and a re-match with the Cavaliers which they lost.

Mike Bianco and his Ole Miss Rebel squad topped 40 wins for the 7th time, won the SEC Western Division title, and also captured the SEC Conference Tournament title played annually in Hoover, Alabama. The tournament proved dramatic as the #2 seeded Rebels lost their first game to Auburn and then faced elimination against Georgia in their second. The match against Georgia went to extra innings prompting a comeback in the 10th inning with Georgia leading 4-3. The team collected the necessary 2-runs in the bottom of the 10th for a walk-off win. This win vaulted the team to three consecutive wins (Auburn, Texas A&M, LSU) and the title as their pitching staff gave up just 2 runs in the remaining 27 innings of play. In the final game of the tournament the Rebels defeated long-time rival LSU by a margin of 9–1 in a rematch of the 2008 final.

The 2018 NCAA Division I baseball tournament opened in Oxford a day late after flooding left Swayze Field underwater. The Rebels fell down early 2–0 to the St. Louis University Billikens and their ace pitcher, Miller Hogan. A 6-run 2nd inning followed by 2 more runs in the 3rd chased Hogan from the game as the Rebels went on to a 9–2 win. However, Ole Miss was subsequently eliminated from the post-season after losing two straight to Tennessee Tech, winner of the Oxford Regional.

In 2019, the decade ended with Ole Miss winning yet another 40 games in a season. They fell one run short of winning the SEC tournament title for the second year in a row against #1 Vanderbilt. The Arkansas Razorbacks proved a key figure in the Ole Miss 2019 run as the Rebels bested the Razorbacks in Fayetteville during the regular season. During the SEC tournament the Razorbacks once again raised their Hog Call as the Rebels met them twice, losing the first match but winning the second. The remarkable SEC tournament run played Ole Miss into a regional host position and a #12 national seed.

The 2019 NCAA Division I baseball tournament saw Illinois, Clemson, and Jacksonville State visiting Oxford for regional play. Ole Miss wasted no time racking up wins and scoring runs. They defeated Clemson between two Jacksonville State wins to take the regional 3–0 with a 41–7 run margin. The next weekend saw the Rebels travel to a well-known destination, Fayetteville, to meet the Arkansas Razorbacks once again. The Super Regional saw Ole Miss and Arkansas play their sixth, seventh, and eighth contests of the season against one another.

Ole Miss began the 2022 NCAA Division I baseball tournament as the No. 3 seed in the Coral Gables Regional. They defeated Arizona, #6 Miami and Arizona to advance to the Hattiesburg Super Regional against in-state competitor Southern Miss. There, the Rebels shut out the No. 11 Eagles (10-0, 5-0) to reach the College World Series for the second time under Bianco and sixth in program history. Ole Miss opened the 2022 College World Series with a 5–1 victory over #14 Auburn before defeating Arkansas 13–5 to leave them one game from the finals. Arkansas would rebound for a 3–2 win in game 2 before the Rebels advanced to the CWS finals for the first time with a 2–0 win in game 3. Matched up against Oklahoma, Ole Miss swept the Sooners with a 10–3 victory in game 1 and a 4–2 victory in game 2 to win the program's first national championship.

NCAA Regional appearances

NCAA Super Regional appearances

NCAA College World Series appearances

Stadiums

Oxford-University Stadium/ Swayze Field

Ole Miss baseball plays their home games at Oxford-University Stadium/ Swayze Field, a $3.75 million facility that was completed in October, 1988. The first game held there was against Cumberland University on February 19, 1989 in which the Rebels took a doubleheader sweep.

Attendance milestones
Ole Miss commonly draws more than 10,000 fans to a single game. The first crowd in excess of 10,000 (10,323) occurred on June 6, 2009 against Virginia in Super Regional play. The first crowd in excess of 11,000 (11,729) occurred during a regular season game against Alabama on April 13, 2013. The first crowd to top 12,000 (12,117) packed Swayze for an opening day game against East Carolina on February 17, 2017. The current record is 12,151 set against LSU on April 28, 2018.

Stadium attendance

NCAA Baseball Attendance

Year-by-year results

Notable players

National awards
ABCA/Rawlings Gold Glove Catcher
Hayden Dunhurst – 2021
D1Baseball Freshman of the Year
Jacob Gonzalez – 2021
Brooks Wallace Award
Grae Kessinger – 2019
Johnny Bench Award
Stuart Turner – 2013
Collegiate Baseball Freshman of the Year Award
Stephen Head – 2003

SEC awards
Pitcher of the Year
Drew Pomeranz – 2010
Player of the Year Award
Stephen Head – 2004
Freshman of the Year Award
Seth Smith – 2002
Stephen Head – 2003
Jordan Henry – 2007

1st Team All-Americans

Ole Miss and MLB

Active Major League Baseball (MLB) players
Anthony Alford (Ole Miss football player), OF, Pittsburgh Pirates
Aaron Barrett, RHP, Washington Nationals
Lance Lynn, RHP, Chicago White Sox
Mike Mayers, RHP, Los Angeles Angels
Drew Pomeranz, LHP, San Diego Padres
Jacob Waguespack, RHP, Toronto Blue Jays
Bobby Wahl, RHP, Milwaukee Brewers
Nick Fortes, C, Miami Marlins

Top Five Round MLB Draft Picks

First round
 (1970) 8th Overall - Daniel Adams, 3B, Milwaukee Brewers
 (1999) 42nd Overall - Mike Rosamond, OF, Houston Astros
 (2006) 36th Overall - Chris Coghlan, 3B, Florida Marlins
 (2008) 39th Overall - Lance Lynn, RHP, St. Louis Cardinals
 (2010) 5th Overall - Drew Pomeranz, LHP, Cleveland Indians
 (2018) 22nd Overall - Ryan Rolison, LHP, Colorado Rockies
 (2021) 19th Overall - Gunnar Hoglund, RHP, Toronto Blue Jays

Second round
 (1969) 34th Overall - Tom Nichols, SS, Minnesota Twins
 (1971) 39th Overall - Archie Manning, SS, Kansas City Royals
 (1972) 40th Overall - Steve Dillard, SS, Boston Red Sox
 (2004) 50th Overall - Seth Smith, OF, Colorado Rockies
 (2005) 62nd Overall - Stephen Head, 1B, Cleveland Indians
 (2007) 79th Overall - Zack Cozart, SS, Cincinnati Reds
 (2007) 65th Overall - Will Kline, RHP, Tampa Bay Rays
 (2008) 67th Overall - Cody Satterwhite, RHP, Detroit Tigers
 (2016) 57th Overall - J. B. Woodman, OF, Toronto Blue Jays
 (2019) 68th Overall - Grae Kessinger, SS, Houston Astros
 (2021) 58th Overall - Doug Nikhazy, LHP, Cleveland Indians

Third round
 (1967) 41st Overall - James Yawn, 2B, New York Yankees
 (1973) 60th Overall - Paul Husband, OF, St. Louis Cardinals
 (1980) 69th Overall - Jeff Calhoun, LHP, Houston Astros
 (2005) 100th Overall - Mark Holliman, RHP, Chicago Cubs
 (2005) 97th Overall - Matt Maloney, LHP, Philadelphia Phillies
 (2005) 86th Overall - Brian Pettway, OF, Toronto Blue Jays
 (2013) 93rd Overall - Mike Mayers, RHP, St. Louis Cardinals
 (2013) 78th Overall - Stuart Turner, C, Minnesota Twins
 (2014) 88th Overall - Chris Ellis, RHP, Los Angeles Angels
 (2020) 74th Overall - Anthony Servideo, SS, Baltimore Orioles

Fourth round
 (1992) 112th Overall - Ken Carlyle, RHP, Detroit Tigers
 (2009) 129th Overall - Scott Bittle, RHP, St. Louis Cardinals
 (2012) 147th Overall - Alex Yarbrough, 2B, Los Angeles Angels
 (2018) 117th Overall - Nick Fortes, C, Miami Marlins
 (2020) 107th Overall - Tyler Keenan, 3B, Seattle Mariners

Fifth round
 (2005) 146th Overall - Eric Fowler, LHP, Toronto Blue Jays
 (2009) 145th Overall - Nate Baker, LHP, Pittsburgh Pirates
 (2013) 161st Overall - Bobby Wahl, RHP, Oakland Athletics
 (2014) 147th Overall - Austin Bousfield, OF, San Diego Padres
 (2018) 143rd Overall - Brady Feigl, RHP, Oakland Athletics
 (2019) 159th Overall - Will Ethridge, RHP, Colorado Rockies
 (2019) 163rd Overall - Thomas Dillard, C, Milwaukee Brewers

Rivalry

See also
List of NCAA Division I baseball programs

References

External links